The Stinky & Dirty Show is an animated television series that premiered on January 15, 2015 on Amazon Prime Video. It is a show about vehicles, and is aimed at teaching kids creative methods for solving problems. A preview was shown alongside two other potential series; Sara Solves It and Buddy: Tech Detective. It ultimately won in view, and the other two shows were scrapped. The series premiered in 2015 with its first season, and ended with an extended second season lasting until summer 2019.

Plot
The adventures of best friends and unlikely heroes, Stinky the garbage truck and Dirty the backhoe loader, a dynamic and hilarious duo of resourcefulness that learn that when things don't go as expected, asking "what if" can lead to success. The series is based on the books by Jim and Kate McMullan.

Characters

 Stinky (voiced by Jaden Betts in season 1; Issac Ryan Brown in season 2) – A brown rear loader garbage truck who is the sillier one of the duo. He sees value in garbage where others don't and often provides materials needed to solve a problem, though he often attempts sillier methods such as sneaking in his favorite trash item (moldy melons). Although both Stinky and Dirty hate being clean, Stinky doesn't mind being washed... so long as he retains his signature foul odor.
 Dirty (voiced by Jacob Guenther in season 1; Jet Jurgensmeyer in season 2) – A yellow backhoe loader with a rotating cab who is the more mature one and the brains of the duo. He dreams of becoming the world's best building truck and often thinks more logically in their plans than his best friend. He often draws his ideas on a soft surface on the ground to review ideas, and has a liking for dirt. He has a rock collection and a two-way radio used to call other vehicles for assistance. Although both Stinky and Dirty hate being clean, Dirty has a fear of soap, and often panics if he comes in contact with the fluid.
 Tall (voiced by Wallace Shawn) – A yellow and blue mobile crane who lifts things faster when he laughs.
 Chip (voiced by Darin De Paul) – A blue excavator with a yellow jackhammer and orange hard hat.
 Big Ben (voiced by Jonathan Adams and Rick D. Wasserman from late season 1 to early season 2) – A large green semi flatbed truck.
 Chill (voiced by Billy West) – A pink, cream and powder blue ice cream truck with a large spinning vanilla ice cream cone on his roof and green doors. He speaks in a relaxed manner and is very level headed.
 Mighty (voiced by Jack McGraw) – A black and red tug boat.
 Sender (voiced by Anna Camp) – A mail truck with pink hubcaps who loves spreading the love.
 Dumper (voiced by Jane Lynch) – A blue dump truck who likes music and dancing.
 Monster Truck (voiced by Tom Kenny) – A blue and red paranoid monster truck.
 Meg (voiced by Whoopi Goldberg) – A news truck with megaphone who often gives announcements.
 Jumpy (voiced by Kimberly Brooks) – A purple and green stunting sport bike with multiple shows and films.
 Brave (voiced by Andy Richter) – A handsome fire truck who likes being shiny, but was originally afraid of the sound of popcorn popping.
 Chopper (voiced by Jonny Cruz) – A blue and green helicopter who serves as an aerial reporter and delivery man.
 Digby (voiced by Tom Kenny) – An orange excavator.
 Mixy (voiced by Tom Kenny) – A yellow and white cement truck with a french accent.
 Moby Dee (voiced by Cathy Cavadini) – An orange cargo ship with a yellow crane and cream cabin.
 Smash (voiced by Tish Hicks) – A green and black crawler crane with a wrecking ball.
 Fast (voiced by David Shatraw) – A cyan fast-paced diesel locomotive.
 Zoom (voiced by Grey Griffin) – An energetic cyan, pink and orange roller coaster.
 Buoys (voiced by Tom Kenny and Cathy Cavadini) – A group of buoys. Two of them have also been named Ding and Ding Ding.
 Queen Justine (voiced by Angelique Perrin) – A cruise ship.
 Spacy (voiced by Mark Hamill) – A Space Shuttle orbiter.
 Linus (voiced by JP Karliak) – An orange road marking machine.
 Sweepy (voiced by Mikey Kelley) – A blue and green street sweeper.
 Red (voiced by Joan Cusack) – A red race car.
 Sparks (voiced by Mikey Kelley) – A blue race car with yellow lightning bolts.
 Carla (voiced by Kimberly Brooks) – A friendly cream, black and green ferry.
 Steam (voiced by Alex Désert) – A brown steam locomotive.
 Santa Claus (voiced by Roger Craig Smith) – Himself.
 Building Crane (voiced by Darin De Paul) – An orange tower crane.
 Rollin (voiced by Tom Kenny) – A blue and yellow road roller with and orange hard hat.
 Haul (voiced by Gary Anthony Williams) – A purple semi truck who remembers his inventory by song.
 Speedy (voiced by Tom Kenny) – A yellow and orange speedboat.
 Sidekick Semi (voiced by Gary Anthony Williams) – A purple semi truck serving as Jumpy's sidekick in her films.
 Tractor Sue (voiced by Mo Collins) – A green tractor from a neighboring farm.
 Shutter (voiced by Grey Griffin) – A pink and blue bucket truck with a job as a photographer.
 Burger (voiced by Jeff Bennett) – A food truck designed to resemble a hamburger.
 Coupe (voiced by Grey Griffin) – An orange coupe who likes the shade.
 Sedan (voiced by Jeff Bennett) – A blue sedan who likes talking.
 Rover (voiced by Darin De Paul) – A space rover that acts as Spacy's pet, specifically a dog.
 Griswold (voiced by Billy West) – A friendly tan and brown station wagon.
 Toots (voiced by Jeff Bennett) – A pink car with an assortment of gold and silver horns on his body and speaks with a british accent.
 Towpher (voiced by Jeff Bennett) – A green and brown tow truck.
 Miss Bee (voiced by Whoopi Goldberg) – A race car painted in bee stripes.
 Dottie (voiced by David Shatraw) – A green race car with blue and red polka dots.
 Forklifts (voiced by Jeff Bennett, JP Karliak and other assorted actors) – Orange forklifts working in Go City.
 Carry (voiced by Alex Désert) – A red semi truck with an orange car carrier trailer.
 New Cars (voiced by Serenity Reign Brown, Grey Griffin, Jet Jurgensmeyer and Mikey Kelley) – A group of six small childlike minivans.
Tanker (voiced by Darin De Paul) – A blue tank truck.

Episodes

Season 1 (2015–2016)

Season 2 (2017–2019)

Reception 
Common Sense Media gave the show an overall 5 of 5 stars, noting the positive messaging and role models as providing "inspiring reminders about individual potential".

Awards and nominations

References

External links
 
 

2010s American animated television series
2010s American children's television series
2016 American television series debuts
2019 American television series endings
2016 Irish television series debuts
2019 Irish television series endings
Amazon Prime Video original programming
American children's animated adventure television series
Irish children's animated adventure television series
American preschool education television series
Irish preschool education television series
Animated preschool education television series
2010s preschool education television series
Television series by Brown Bag Films
Animated television series by Amazon Studios
Amazon Prime Video children's programming
English-language television shows